Oneira  is a science fiction comedy written for BBC Radio 4 Extra by Robert Easby.  It tells a surreal story of the encounter between a young museum guard, called Oneira, and a 400-year-old alchemist calling himself Nikolai.  Nikolai claims to be the artist who painted one of the pictures hanging in the museum.  The painting includes a figure who resembles Nikolai himself.  He also tells Oneira that he and she are destined to search for a book of alchemy called the Lux Ata or "Book of Black Light".  The resulting quest involves aliens, string theory, a sinister official from the electricity board called "Mister Resistor", a TV cooking show, a cappuccino bar, a comedian travelling by flying saucer, and a dead science fiction author.  Oneira's boyfriend Pete is transformed from an up-and-coming young financier in the City into a bucket of water and a pair of Argyll socks while their expensive penthouse flat is destroyed by a ravenous refrigerator.

Cast
Oneira - Lyndsey Marshal
Nikolai - Peter Marinker
Other parts - Joseph Kloska, Gerard McDermott, Saikat Ahamed, Chas Early, Jon Glover, Christine Kavanagh, Bethan Walker, Sam Dale, Anna Wing, Mark Straker

References

BBC Radio comedy programmes
Science fiction comedy
British science fiction radio programmes
BBC Radio 4 Extra programmes